Kelly Oxford is a Canadian author, director, and screenwriter.

Career 
In 1996, Oxford dropped out of Mount Royal University after one semester. She started blogging as a means of daily productivity and self-publishing. She later worked as a waitress and at a shoe store.

In 2001, Oxford became a full-time stay-at-home mother and began focusing on her online writing and scriptwriting. She started an anonymous blog in 2002, joined Twitter in 2009, and gained a large following, eventually attracting the attention of celebrities including Diablo Cody and Roger Ebert and being contacted by a number of agents. She sold a television script to CBS, to be executive produced by Jessica Alba, based on her life as a mother in Calgary. She then wrote another pilot that was bought by NBC. Neither script has been produced. Oxford moved to Los Angeles in 2012.

In 2013 Oxford published a semi-autobiographical book, Everything Is Perfect When You're a Liar, which became a New York Times bestseller.

In 2014 Oxford appeared on the reality show Candidly Nicole, starring Lionel Richie's daughter Nicole Richie.

Oxford and Molly McNearney, head writer for Jimmy Kimmel Live!, developed a semi-autobiographical comedy for TV Land in early 2016. The pair would write and star in the series.

Following the release of the Donald Trump and Billy Bush recording during the 2016 presidential election, Oxford tweeted a request for women to "tweet me your first assaults", using the hashtag #notokay, and within days received 27 million views and responses. The response was so large that it received coverage by The New York Times and other media.

On April 18, 2017, Oxford released her second book, When You Find Out the World is Against You: And Other Funny Memories About Awful Moments. While appearing on Jimmy Kimmel Live! as part of the book's launch, she revealed that it was during a kitchen table conversation with Kimmel and his head writer (and wife) McNearney that the segment "Mean Tweets" originated, after she and Kimmel read cruel tweets to each other in a humorous way, trying to outdo each other.

In March 2017, Oxford was developing a 1990s-set teen drama series for Hulu, with her The Disaster Artist collaborators James Franco, Seth Rogen, and Evan Goldberg producing.

In October 2020 her directorial debut Pink Skies Ahead premiered at AFI Fest.

Personal life 
Oxford and her husband James were together for 17 years until divorcing in 2016. She has three children, Salinger, Henry and Beatrix.

Books 
 (2013) Everything Is Perfect When You're a Liar (paperback edition 2014)
 (2017) When You Find Out the World is Against You: And Other Funny Memories About Awful Moments (hardcover)

References

External links
 
 

1977 births
Living people
Canadian bloggers
21st-century Canadian non-fiction writers
21st-century Canadian women writers
Canadian women screenwriters
Canadian memoirists
Canadian women memoirists
Canadian women bloggers
21st-century Canadian screenwriters
21st-century memoirists